Vera Shtelbaums (born April 24, 1937 in Omsk, Russia) is a Russian rhythmic gymnastics coach.

Coaching career 
Following her graduation from the Omsk Institute of Physical Education in 1959, Shtelbaums worked as a head rhythmic gymnastics coach at the Omsk State School of Olympic Reserve. She remained in this position for over 25 years.

Shtelbaums has coached multiple Olympic and World Champions, notably Evgenia Kanaeva, Irina Tchachina and Ksenia Dudkina. She was the personal coach of Kanaeva since 2003 and Tchachina since 1993.

She is currently a member of the Presidium of the Russian Rhythmic Gymnastics Federation, and leads the Omsk regional center of rhythmic gymnastics. She is an Honored coach of Russia and Honored Worker of Physical Culture.

Personal life
She has one daughter, Elena Arais, who is also a rhythmic gymnastics coach and choreographer. Her husband, Nikolay Shtelbaums, was a former Soviet speedskater.

Notable trainees 
She has trained multiple World and Olympic champions including:
 Evgenia Kanaeva - two time Olympic Champion (2008 Beijing and 2012 London) and three time all-around World Champion
 Irina Tchachina - 2004 Olympic silver medalist, two time all-around World bronze medalist
 Ksenia Dudkina - 2012 Olympics Group all-around gold medalist, European Group all-around champion 
 Vera Biryukova - 2016 Olympics Group all-around gold medalist and multiple World Cup medals
 Maria Titova - 2013 Grand Prix Final all-around silver medalist
 Zarina Gizikova - World and European Team gold medalist
 Sofya Skomorokh - 2014 Youth Olympics Group all-around gold medalist, 2015 World Championship Group all-around gold medalist and 2015 European Games Group all-around gold medalist 
 Anastasia Simakova - 2019 World Junior rope and team all-around champion

References

External links
 Vera Shtelbaums
 Rhythmic Gymnastics Results

1937 births
Living people
Sportspeople from Omsk
Russian gymnastics coaches
Honoured Masters of Sport of the USSR
Honoured Coaches of Russia